β-Hydroxybutyric acid, also known as 3-hydroxybutyric acid or BHB, is an organic compound and a beta hydroxy acid with the chemical formula CH3CH(OH)CH2CO2H; its conjugate base is β-hydroxybutyrate, also known as 3-hydroxybutyrate. β-Hydroxybutyric acid is a chiral compound with two enantiomers: D-β-hydroxybutyric acid and L-β-hydroxybutyric acid. Its oxidized and polymeric derivatives occur widely in nature.  In humans, D-β-hydroxybutyric acid is one of two primary endogenous agonists of hydroxycarboxylic acid receptor 2 (HCA2), a  G protein-coupled receptor (GPCR).

Biosynthesis
In humans,  can be synthesized in the liver via the metabolism of fatty acids (e.g., butyrate), and ketogenic amino acids through a series of reactions that metabolize these compounds into acetoacetate, which is the first ketone body that is produced in the fasting state.

Butyrate can also be metabolized into  via a second metabolic pathway that does not involve acetoacetate as a metabolic intermediate. This metabolic pathway is as follows:
butyrate→butyryl-CoA→crotonyl-CoA→β-hydroxybutyryl-CoA→poly-β-hydroxybutyrate→()→
The last reaction in this metabolic pathway, which involves the conversion of  into , is catalyzed by the hydroxybutyrate-dimer hydrolase enzyme.

The concentration of β-hydroxybutyrate in human blood plasma, as with other ketone bodies, increases through ketosis. This elevated β-hydroxybutyrate level is naturally expected, as β-hydroxybutyrate is formed from acetoacetate. The compound can be used as an energy source by the brain and skeletal muscle when blood glucose is low.  Diabetic patients can have their ketone levels tested via urine or blood to indicate diabetic ketoacidosis.  In alcoholic ketoacidosis, this ketone body is produced in greatest concentration.  Ketogenesis occurs if oxaloacetate in the liver cells is depleted, a circumstance created by reduced carbohydrate intake (through diet or starvation); prolonged, excessive alcohol consumption; and/or insulin deficiency. Because oxaloacetate is crucial for entry of acetyl-CoA into the TCA cycle, the rapid production of acetyl-CoA from fatty acid oxidation in the absence of ample oxaloacetate overwhelms the decreased capacity of the TCA cycle, and the resultant excess of acetyl-CoA is shunted towards ketone body production.

Biological activity

D-β-Hydroxybutyric acid, along with butyric acid, are the two primary endogenous agonists of hydroxycarboxylic acid receptor 2 (HCA2), a  GPCR.

β-Hydroxybutyric acid is able to cross the blood-brain-barrier into the central nervous system. Levels of β-hydroxybutyric acid increase in the liver, heart, muscle, brain, and other tissues with exercise, calorie restriction, fasting, and ketogenic diets. The compound has been found to act as a histone deacetylase (HDAC) inhibitor. Through inhibition of the HDAC class I isoenzymes HDAC2 and HDAC3, β-hydroxybutyric acid has been found to increase brain-derived neurotrophic factor (BDNF) levels and TrkB signaling in the hippocampus. Moreover, a rodent study found that prolonged exercise increases plasma β-hydroxybutyrate concentrations, which induces promoters of the BDNF gene in the hippocampus. These findings may have clinical relevance in the treatment of depression, anxiety, and cognitive impairment.

In epilepsy patients on the ketogenic diet, blood β-hydroxybutyrate levels correlate best with degree of seizure control. The threshold for optimal anticonvulsant effect appears to be approximately 4 mmol/L.

Laboratory and industrial chemistry
β-Hydroxybutyric acid is the precursor to polyesters, which are biodegradable plastics. This polymer, poly(3-hydroxybutyrate), is also naturally produced by the bacteria Alcaligenes eutrophus.

β-Hydroxybutyrate can be extracted from poly(3-hydroxybutyrate) by acid hydrolysis.

See also 
 Hydroxybutyric acid
 Ketogenesis
 Gamma-Hydroxybutyric acid
 β-Hydroxy β-methylbutyric acid (HMB)

Notes

References 

Antidepressants
Beta hydroxy acids
Biomolecules
Histone deacetylase inhibitors